The Church of St Mary Magdalen in Stocklinch, Somerset, England, dates from the 13th century.  It is recorded in the National Heritage List for England as a designated Grade I listed building, and is dedicated to Jesus' companion Mary Magdalene.

The parish is part of the Winsmoor benefice within the Crewkerne and Ilminster deanery.

See also

 Grade I listed buildings in South Somerset
 List of Somerset towers
 List of ecclesiastical parishes in the Diocese of Bath and Wells

References

13th-century church buildings in England
Church of England church buildings in South Somerset
English Gothic architecture in Somerset
Grade I listed churches in Somerset
Grade I listed buildings in South Somerset
Former churches in Somerset
Hamstone buildings